The Lubombo Transfrontier Conservation Area was born out of the Peace Park Foundation’s vision to establish a network of transfrontier conservation areas in southern Africa. It straddles the border between South Africa’s KwaZulu-Natal province, southern Mozambique, and Eswatini.

Overview
It is situated on a low-lying coastal plain between the Lebombo Mountains in the west and the Indian Ocean in the east. The area offers a unique combination of big-game country, extensive wetlands, and beautiful undeveloped coastal areas. It links the Maputo Elephant Reserve in Mozambique through the Futi Corridor and the Lubombo Conservancy in Eswatini to the Tembe Elephant Park in South Africa, creating the first major elephant stronghold along Africa's eastern coastline.

Maputo Elephant Reserve
Now known as Maputo Special Reserve (or Reserva Especial de Maputo in Portuguese), this  reserve is situated in the southernmost part of Mozambique, 79 km south of Maputo, in the province of Maputo. It is bounded on the east by the Indian Ocean, and on the west by the Rio Maputo.

In 1975 before the Mozambique civil war, vast numbers of wildlife including 65 White Rhinoceros where relocated from Umfolozi Game Reserve in Kwazulu Natal, South Africa. Sadly no rhinoceros and only some 200 elephant survived the 14-year war.

The elephant reserve is now threatened by industrial development 

On 18 July 2012 Macauhub News Agency reported that a public tender will be issued for selection of the company that will carry out the studies of the economic feasibility of building a deep water port an Techobanine.

The Mozambique Transport and Communications Minister, Paulo Zucula, said the master plan for the project had recently been completed, and that the proposal was due to be presented soon to the Council of Ministers.  The port complex is expected to cover an area of 30,000 hectares, and will have an additional area of 11,000 hectares for industrial development, as well as capacity to process 200 million tons of cargo. 

The Techobanine region is 70km from Maputo and 20km north of Ponta do Ouro.

Tembe Elephant Park

Tembe Elephant Park is situated in Maputaland, in the north-eastern region of KwaZulu-Natal, South Africa adjoining the Mozambique border. It is home to the province's biggest African elephant herd and its only indigenous elephants. Tembe's  comprises a variety of unique sand forest, woodland, grassland and swampland habitats.

The Greater St. Lucia Wetland Park
The Greater St Lucia Wetland Park in the Ponta do Ouro-Kosi Bay Transfrontier Conservation Area was proclaimed a World Heritage Site in November 1999. The site is the largest estuarine system in Africa and includes the southernmost extension of coral reefs on the continent. Efforts are ongoing to extend the existing World Heritage Site northwards to encompass the Mozambican section of the TFCA, which includes a marine protected area.

Lubombo Conservancy
Situated in the north eastern part of Eswatini in the Lubombo Region. This protected  area includes the Hlane Royal National Park, the Mlawula Nature Reserve, the Shewula Community Nature Reserve, the Mbuluzi Game Reserve the Nkhalashane Siza Ranch and the Inyoni Yami Swaziland Irrigation Scheme, (also known as the IYSIS).

See also
Protected areas of South Africa
List of conservation areas of Mozambique
Protected areas of Eswatini
Usuthu-Tembe-Futi Transfrontier Conservation Area

References

External links
 Peace Parks Foundation’s website
 Conservation website
 KwaZulu-Natal Provincial Government homepage
 Ezemvelo KZN Wildlife (previous known as Natal Parks Board
 SANParks
 Swaziland National Trust Commission
 ACTF
 Mozambican Tour Operator (Mozaic Travel) that runs guided tours in Maputo Special Reserve

Peace parks
Nature conservation in Mozambique
Protected areas of South Africa
Protected areas of Eswatini
Transboundary protected areas